Sethiyur is a [village in Cuddalore district, Tamil Nadu, on the south-west coast of India. It has a population of 1,347.

References

External links
 / Photos of Sethiyur
 Sethiyur on Wikimapia
 Sethiyur- a view from satilite

Villages in Cuddalore district